Symphony No. 35 may refer to:

 Symphony No. 35 (Haydn)
 Symphony No. 35 (Michael Haydn)
 Symphony No. 35 (Mozart)

035